Before It Had a Name is a 2005 film directed by Giada Colagrande and co-written by her and husband Willem Dafoe.  The film premiered at the Venice Film Festival and was retitled as The Black Widow when it was released on DVD. It marked the first time Dafoe had developed a project to the point of being shot as well as the first time Colagrande had written in English.

Synopsis
After her lover Karl dies, Eleonora goes to his New York estate known as 'The Rubber House' in hopes of learning about him. While there, she becomes involved with the property's strange caretaker, Leslie.

Principal cast

Critical reception
Boyd Van Hoei wrote in Cine Europa:

References

External links 

2005 films
Films shot in New York (state)
American independent films
MoviePass Films films
2000s English-language films
2000s American films